Der Alte means "the old man" in the German language, and may refer to:

Der Alte (television series), a long-running German television series
Der Alte, nickname for the German politician Konrad Adenauer
Der Alte, Alice Wagner's translation of the Maxim Gorky's play The Old Man, published in 1957